Alianza F.C. is a professional soccer club based in Panama City, Panama. Since 1999, it competes in Liga Panameña de Fútbol, the top tier of Panamanian football. The club was founded in 1963, and still owned by the Cardenas family.

History
Alianza F.C. was founded on March 2, 1963 by a group of 12 young players that had represented Panama in the first CONCACAF Youth Championship.  That date makes them the second oldest club in modern Panamanian soccer.

The club was supported by various benefactors such as the local police, Don Justiniano Cardenas, and the Espivak Company during its early decades.  
In 1980, the club was chosen among other eight clubs to participate in the first professional soccer league in Panama, which was called the Liga Superior de Fútbol de Panamá.

As of 1989, the club joined to Anaprof's non-amateur football tournaments, which was interrupted by the disunity that arose in the local football environment, and was forced to compete in the so-called Linfuna League. After two seasons, the club returned to the Primera A of ANAPROF, where won promotion two seasons afterwards after beating Atletico Guadalupe 1–0.  In 2003, they enjoyed their best season ever, reaching the Clausura finals before losing 5-1 to Tauro FC.

The club has always placed a strong emphasis on youth teams, competing at the U-12, U-14, U-15, U-16, and U-19 levels.

Support
During mid 90s team was based on Chilibre, Panama City´s northern area playing home matches at El Camping Resort soccer field, by mid 2000s the team left the area to play matches at different venues causing a lack of identity, low fan support base and heavily criticized by media. By 2012 the team start playing home matches at Luis Cascarita Tapia stadium looking to gain more fan support from the Juan Diaz neighborhood, Panama City´s east side. Since 2018 the team has heavily marketed on the neighborhood to gain new supporters and attracting kids to their youth teams.

Kits

Kit suppliers and shirt sponsors

Previous Kits

Honours
 Primera A: 1
1999

 Anaprof: 2
Clausura 2003

Players

Current squad
 As of Apertura 2023

Records
All time scorer is César el "Bombo" Medina.

Notable players

Historical list of coaches

 Leroy Foster (Feb 2003 – Oct 2003)
 Rubén Cárdenas (Oct 2003–)
 Leroy Foster (Jun 2007–)
 Rubén Cárdenas (2007)
 Rubén "Tátara" Guevara (Jun 2008 – Oct 08)
 Rubén Cárdenas
 Víctor René Mendieta (Jul 2009 – Oct 09)
 Carlos Pérez Porras (Dec 2009 – Feb 11)
 Leroy Foster (2010)
 Ángelo Luis Evans (Feb 2011 – July 11)
 Elkin Ortiz Castaño (Aug 2011 – May 2012)
 Rubén Octavio Cárdenas (June 2012 – Dec 2012)
 Elkin Ortiz Castaño (Dec 2012 – Oct 13)
 Carlos Pérez Porras (Oct 2013 – Sep 14)
 Leroy Foster (Jun 2014 – Aug 14)
 Juan Pablo Lopera (Sep 2014 – Sep 2015)
 Rubén Cárdenas (Sep 2015–2019)
 Cecilio Garcés (2019– March 2021)
 Jair Palacios (March 2021 - Present)

References

External links
The Official Website of the Alianza, F.C.

Football clubs in Panama
Association football clubs established in 1963
1963 establishments in Panama
Sport in Panama City
Panama City